Pandanus is a genus of monocots with some 750 accepted species. They are palm-like, dioecious trees and shrubs native to the Old World tropics and subtropics. The greatest number of species are found in Madagascar and Malaysia. Common names include pandan, screw palm, and screw pine. They are classified in the order Pandanales, family Pandanaceae.

Description 

Often called pandanus palms, these plants are not closely related to palm trees. The trunk is stout, wide-branching, and ringed with many leaf scars. Mature plants can have branches. Depending on the species, the trunk can be smooth, rough, or warty. The roots form a pyramidal tract to hold the trunk. They commonly have many thick stilt roots near the base, which provide support as the tree grows top-heavy with leaves, fruit, and branches. These roots are adventitious and often branched.

They are dioecious, with male and female flowers produced on different plants. The female tree produces flowers with round fruits that are also bract-surrounded. The individual fruit is a drupe, and these merge to varying degrees forming multiple fruit, a globule structure,  in diameter and have many prism-like sections, resembling the fruit of the pineapple. Typically, the fruit changes from green to bright orange or red as it matures. The fruits can stay on the tree for more than 12 months.

Taxonomy 
The genus is named after the Malay word pandan given to Pandanus amaryllifolius, the genus's most commonly known species. The name is derived from Proto-Austronesian *paŋudaN (which became Proto-Malayo-Polynesian *pangdan and Proto-Oceanic *padran). It has many cognates in Austronesian languages, underscoring its importance in Austronesian cultures, including Atayal pangran; Kavalan pangzan; Thao panadan; Tagalog pandan; Chamorro pahong; Manggarai pandang; Malagasy fandrana, Tongan fā; Tahitian fara; Hawaiian hala all referring to plants of similar characteristics and/or uses whether in the same genus (particularly Pandanus tectorius) or otherwise (in the case of Māori whara or hara; e.g. harakeke).

The oldest fossil of the genus is Pandanus estellae which is known from a silicified fruit found in Queensland, Australia, dating to the Oligocene, around 32-28 million years ago.

Ecology
Pandanus trees are of cultural, health, and economic importance in the Pacific, second only to the coconut on atolls. They grow wild mainly in semi-natural vegetation in littoral habitats throughout the tropical and subtropical Pacific, where they can withstand drought, strong winds, and salt spray. They propagate readily from seed, but popular cultivars are also widely propagated from branch cuttings by local people.

Species growing on exposed coastal headlands and along beaches have thick 'stilt roots' as anchors in the loose sand. Those stilt roots emerge from the stem, usually close to but above the ground, which helps to keep the plants upright and secure them to the ground.

While pandanus are distributed throughout the tropical and subtropical islands and coastlines of the Atlantic, Indian and Pacific Oceans, they are most numerous on the low islands and barren atolls of Polynesia and Micronesia. Other species are adapted to mountain habitats and riverine forests.

The tree is grown and propagated from shoots that form spontaneously in the axils of lower leaves. Pandanus fruits are eaten by animals including bats, rats, crabs, and elephants, but the vast majority of species are dispersed primarily by water. Its fruit can float and spread to other islands without help from humans.

Uses
Pandanus has multiple uses, which is dependent in part on each type and location. Some Pandanus are a source of food while others provide raw material for clothing, basket weaving and shelter. 

Pandanus leaves are used for handicrafts. Artisans collect the leaves from plants in the wild, cutting only mature leaves so that the plant will naturally regenerate. The leaves are sliced into fine strips and sorted for further processing. Weavers produce basic pandan mats of standard size or roll the leaves into pandan ropes for other designs. This is followed by a coloring process, in which pandan mats are placed in drums with water-based colors. After drying, the colored mats are shaped into final products, such as placemats or jewelry boxes. Final color touch-ups may be applied. The species in Hawaiʻi are called hala, and only the dry leaves (lauhala) are collected and used for Lauhala weaving.

Pandanus leaves from Pandanus amaryllifolius are used widely in Southeast Asian and South Asian cuisines to add a distinct aroma to various dishes and to complement flavors like chocolate. Because of their similarity in usage, pandan leaves are sometimes referred to as the "vanilla of Asia." Fresh leaves are typically torn into strips, tied in a knot to facilitate removal, placed in the cooking liquid, then removed at the end of cooking. Dried leaves and bottled extract may be bought in some places. Finely sliced pandan leaves are used as fragrant confetti for Malay weddings, graves etc.

Pandan leaves are known as Daun pandan in Indonesian and Malaysian Malay; Dahon ng pandan (lit. "pandan leaf") or simply pandan in Filipino; 斑蘭 (bān lán) in Mandarin; as ใบเตย (bai toei) in Thai, lá dứa in Vietnamese; pulao data in Bengali; and rampe in Sinhalese and Hindi.

In India particularly in Nicobar Islands, Pandanus fruit is staple food of Shompen people and Nicobarese people.

In Sri Lanka, pandan leaves are used heavily in both vegetable and meat dishes and are often grown in homes. It is common practice to add a few pieces of pandan leaf when cooking red or white rice as well.

In Southeast Asia, pandan leaves are mainly used in sweets such as coconut jam and pandan cake. In Indonesia and Malaysia, pandan is also added to rice and curry dishes such as nasi lemak. In the Philippines, pandan leaves are commonly paired with coconut meat (a combination referred to as buko pandan) in various desserts and drinks like maja blanca and gulaman.

In Indian cooking, the leaf is added whole to biryani, a kind of rice pilaf, made with ordinary rice (as opposed to that made with the premium-grade basmati rice). The basis for this use is that both basmati and pandan leaf contains the same aromatic flavoring ingredient, 2-acetyl-1-pyrroline. In Sri Lanka, pandan leaves are a major ingredient used in the country's cuisine.

Kewra (also spelled Kevda or Kevada) is an extract distilled from the pandan flower, used to flavor drinks and desserts in Indian cuisine. Also, kewra or kevada is used in religious worship, and the leaves are used to make hair ornaments worn for their fragrance as well as decorative purpose in western India.

Species with large and medium fruit are edible, notably the many cultivated forms of P. tectorius (P. pulposus) and P. utilis. The ripe fruit can be eaten raw or cooked, while partly ripe fruit should be cooked first. Small-fruited pandanus may be bitter and astringent.

Karuka nuts (P. julianettii) are an important staple food in New Guinea.  Over 45 cultivated varieties are known.  Entire households will move, and in some areas will speak a pandanus language at harvest time.  The taste is like coconut or walnuts.

Throughout Oceania, almost every part of the plant is used, with various species different from those used in Southeast Asian cooking. Pandanus trees provide materials for housing; clothing and textiles including the manufacture of dilly bags (carrying bags), fine mats or ie toga; sails, food, medication, decorations, fishing, and religious uses. In the Vanuatu Archipelago, natives make woven fish traps from the hard interior root of the Pandanus, made like a cage having a narrow entrance.

Selected species

Note: several species previously placed in Pandanus subgenus Acrostigma are now in the distinct genus Benstonea.

Pandanus aldabraensis H.St.John
Pandanus amaryllifolius Roxb. ex Lindl. – pandan
Pandanus balfourii Martelli
Pandanus barkleyi Balf.f.
Pandanus boninensis Warb.
Pandanus candelabrum P.Beauv.
Pandanus carmichaelii R.E.Vaughan & Wiehe
Pandanus ceylanicus Solms
Pandanus christmatensis Martelli
Pandanus clandestinus Stone
Pandanus conglomeratus Balf.f.
Pandanus conoideus Lam.
Pandanus decastigma B.C.Stone
Pandanus decipiens Martelli
Pandanus decumbens Solms
Pandanus drupaceus Thouars
Pandanus elatus Ridl.
Pandanus eydouxia Balf.f.
Pandanus fanningensis H.St.John
Pandanus forsteri C.Moore & F.Muell.
Pandanus furcatus Roxb.
Pandanus gabonensis Huynh
Pandanus glaucocephalus R.E.Vaughan & Wiehe
Pandanus grayorum 
Pandanus halleorum B.C.Stone
Pandanus heterocarpus Balf.f.
Pandanus iceryi Horne ex Balf.f.
Pandanus incertus R.E.Vaughan & Wiehe
Pandanus joskei Horne ex Balf.f.
Pandanus julianettii Martelli - karuka
Pandanus kaida Kurz
Pandanus kajui Beentje
Pandanus lacuum H.St.John ex B.C.Stone
Pandanus laxespicatus Martelli
Pandanus livingstonianus Rendle - Tropical Africa
Pandanus leram
Pandanus microcarpus Balf.f.
Pandanus montanus Bory
Pandanus monotheca  Malay Peninsula
Pandanus multispicatus Balf.f.
Pandanus odorifer (Forssk.) Kuntze
Pandanus obeliscus Madagascar
Pandanus palustris Thouars
Pandanus parvicentralis Huynh
Pandanus prostratus Balf.f.
Pandanus pyramidalis Barkly ex Balf.f.
Pandanus rigidifolius R.E.Vaughan & Wiehe
Pandanus sechellarum Balf.f.
Pandanus spathulatus Martelli
Pandanus spiralis R.Br. – Australian screwpine
Pandanus tectorius Parkinson ex Du Roi – thatch screwpine
Pandanus tenuifolius Balf f.
Pandanus teuszii Warb.
Pandanus thomensis Henriq.
Pandanus tonkinensis B.C.Stone
Pandanus utilis Bory – common screwpine
Pandanus vandermeeschii Balf.f.
Pandanus verecundus Stone

See also

 – vessels of the Caroline Islands which traditionally had pandanus mat sails

References

Further reading
Germplasm Resources Information Network: Pandanus
Sorting Pandanus names
Wagner, W. L., Herbst, D. R., & Sohmer, S. H. (1990). Manual of the flowering plants of Hawai'i.
Pandanus species of the Wet Tropics of Queensland, Australia   photos and text by Dave Kimble
Pneumatophores on Pandanus solms-laubachii  - photo essay
 Northernmost pandanus in the world,  in the Azores Islands, photo.
Pandanus simplex fruit eaten by Varanus olivaceus, Polillo Island, Philippines. 
"Hala: The Hawaiian Aphrodisiac" Article by Shannon Wianecki describing Hawaiian cultural uses for pandanus. Maui No Ka 'Oi Magazine Volume 15 Number. 1 (Jan 2011).

External links

Biological Analytics of Pandan

 
Pandanales genera
Medicinal plants